Michael Brown is the former city administrator and former emergency manager of Flint, Michigan, US. He also served as temporary mayor and city administrator of Flint after the resignation of Don Williamson.

Early life
Brown came to Flint after his civil engineer father accepted a Buick plant job. Brown attended St. Michael Catholic School in Flint.

Career
He attended Western Michigan University then later University of Stockholm in Sweden earning his master's degree. In 1970, he was married to Linda. He worked with youth as a counselor.

Public service
In 1983, Brown was elected to the Genesee County Board of Commissioners. Flint mayor, Matthew S. Collier, appointed Brown as the City's director of governmental relations and later in the 1980s as director of Flint's Community and Economic Development department. Brown was the executive director of the Genesee area Red Cross chapter from 1994 to 1996. He moved on to be president of the United Way of Genesee and Lapeer Counties from 1996 to 2002. In 2002, after the recall of Flint Mayor Woodrow Stanley, Brown took out petitions to run for mayor but failed to collect sufficient signatures to be on the ballot.

Hired as president of Capital Area United Way in Lansing, Brown stepped in to straighten operations out after a $2 million embezzlement occurred in 2002. Brown left that position in November and was hired by the Genesee Regional Chamber of Commerce in November 2009 as executive vice-president.

He was appointed city administrator on Wednesday, February 4, 2009. Effective at midnight on February 15, 2009, Brown as city administrator became temporary mayor in accordance with the City Charter following the resignation of Don Williamson for health reasons.

In 2009, he founded the Flint Area Reinvestment Office. He concurrently became president of the Prima Civitas Foundation and served in both position until December 1, 2011. The Michigan Governor, Rick Snyder, appointed Brown as the city's emergency manager on November 29, 2011, effective December 1. He immediately eliminated pay for the mayor and city council of the city, though these were later partially restored. Brown also issued a dozen executive orders over the course of his administration; these were mostly related to the city budget. Other actions taken included the sale of Genesee Towers, the tallest building in Flint, to a developer for $1. Although Brown was forced to step down from his position in August 2012 due to a technicality in state law, he was nominated by his successor, Ed Kurtz, to serve as city administrator. He later resigned from his position in September 2013, citing "family concerns."

References

Mayors of Flint, Michigan
Living people
Year of birth missing (living people)
Western Michigan University alumni
Stockholm University alumni
American city managers
County commissioners in Michigan
20th-century American politicians
21st-century American politicians